Elmbridge may refer to these places in England:
Current uses
Borough of Elmbridge, a  district in northwest Surrey
Elmbridge, Gloucester, Gloucestershire, a suburb and electoral ward
Elmbridge, Worcestershire, a small village and  civil parish

Historic uses
Hundred of Elmbridge, Emelybridge or Amelebridge, a very old division of Surrey
Elmbridge railway station, an 1883-1966 tramway station next to Wisbech, Cambridgeshire (closed to passengers in 1928)